The Society of St. Andrew (SoSA) is a grassroots, faith-based, hunger relief nonprofit working with all denominations to bridge the hunger gap between 96 billion pounds ( billion kilograms) of food wasted every year in the United States and the nearly 40 million Americans who live in poverty. SoSA relies on support from donors, volunteers, and farmers as they glean nutritious excess produce from farmers' fields and orchards after harvest and deliver it to people in need across the United States. SoSA provides nutritious, healthy produce through programs such as the Potato Project, the Gleaning Network, Harvest of Hope, and the Seed Potato Project.

Gleaning is the Biblical practice of hand-gathering crops left in the fields after harvest. Society of St. Andrew staff coordinates volunteers, growers, and distribution agencies to provide food for hungry people through gleaning. Each year, tens of thousands of volunteers come together across the country to glean food left in farmers' fields and orchards so that it does not go to waste but instead goes to the tables of those in need.

Program services
SoSA supplies fresh fruits and vegetables vital for nutrition rather than high caloric "filler food" to society's most vulnerable. That means improved health and well-being as well as full stomachs.
Unlike many organizations, SoSA charges no handling fees. Fresh, nutritious food is provided to agencies serving the poor at no cost to them, which helps them stretch their already tight budgets.
SoSA's programs build community by bringing people together in farmers' fields or around "dumped" loads of potatoes to work collectively in the cause of helping their needy neighbors.
Each program recognizes the spiritual component of helping others and therefore offers a variety of educational programs, Bible studies, and seasonal devotions designed to feed people's spiritual hungers as they help feed the physical hunger of others.

The Society of St. Andrew adheres to Christian principles of good stewardship. Therefore, about 93% of all funds raised by the Society of St. Andrew is spent on the direct delivery of food and services to the hungry. SoSA volunteers have salvaged over 500 million pounds of produce since the Society of St. Andrew began its gleaning and salvage operations in 1983. After factoring in administrative overhead costs, that means that food is provided at a cost to SoSA of just under $0.02 per serving. In other words, for under $50, the Society of St. Andrew can provide a person the USDA recommended requirement of vegetables and fruits for an entire year.

Programs 
SoSA's volunteer network is channeled through three main programs: the Potato Project, the Gleaning Network, and Harvest of Hope.

Potato Project

Potato Project is a program of the Society of St. Andrew. It's a cost-effective way to move produce to the tables of hungry Americans instead of to landfills, reducing waste and fulfilling a social need at the same time. Since the Potato Project was started in 1979, over 500 million pounds of produce have been salvaged through this and other SoSA programs.

Although logistics can get tricky, the concept of the Potato Project is practical and straightforward: tractor-trailer loads of potatoes and other produce are often rejected by commercial markets or potato chip factories due to imperfections in shape, size, surface blemishes, or sugar content. Usually, these perfectly edible rejected loads end up at landfills. Through the Potato Project, however, the Society of St. Andrew is able to redirect these 45,000-pound loads of fresh, nutritious produce to soup kitchens, Native American reservations, food pantries, low income housing areas, local churches, and other hunger agencies for distribution to the poor.

The produce is donated, so the Society of St. Andrew only pays for the transportation and packaging of the food — just six cents per pound or two cents per serving. The food is passed along to those in need at no cost to them. SoSA programs operate on individual donations, church donations, and foundation grants at less than 7% overhead.

Gleaning Network

Gleaning is the traditional Biblical practice of gathering crops that would otherwise be left in the fields to rot or be plowed under after harvest. Because the food is unmarketable, usually due to cosmetic reasons, some growers allow crews of gleaners to pick what is left after harvest to donate to those who are needy. It is also often more cost-effective for farmers to have their crops gleaned than to have paid pickers go back through the fields for the missed produce.

The Society of St. Andrew's Gleaning Network coordinates volunteers, growers, and distribution agencies to salvage food for the needy. Tens of thousands of volunteers from churches, synagogues, scout troops, senior citizen groups, and other organizations participate each year in Gleaning Network activities all across the country. Each year, tens of millions of pounds of produce are salvaged and given to the poor at no cost to them.

Gleaners are people of all ages and income levels who give their time and energy to this process. Within 48 hours of picking the produce, hungry Americans are usually eating the gleaned food. Each year, about 30,000 people join the Gleaning Network in salvaging over 15 million pounds of fresh, nutritious food for their hungry neighbors. The Society of St. Andrew has staff Gleaning Network coordinators in several states as well as volunteer coordinators nationwide. Volunteering can take place over a single morning or for many years of service, and is seen as a practical, humanitarian response to the problem of hunger.

Harvest of Hope
Harvest of Hope is the ecumenical study, worship, and action mission trip program of the Society of St. Andrew.

At Harvest of Hope, participants work in fields gleaning food for the hungry, study hunger issues, and participate in Christian worship.  A variety of events take place throughout the year: week-long retreats for senior high youth (completed grades 9–12) and their adult sponsors; weekend retreats for junior high youth (completed grades 6–8) and their adult sponsors; a weekend retreat for college groups and young adults (ages 18–30); and weekend intergenerational retreats for ages 10 to 100.

Harvest of Hope educates participants about the hunger problem domestically and globally and encourages them to make lifelong commitments to being part of the solution.

Locations 
In addition to its national headquarters in Big Island, Virginia, the Society of St. Andrew operates regional offices in Alabama, Florida, Georgia, Indiana, Mississippi, North Carolina, Ohio, Tennessee, and Virginia. These offices coordinate the regional gleaning networks that cover much of these states and are responsible for all of The Society of St. Andrew's operations within their respective states.

History 
The Society of St. Andrew was started by Rev. Ken Horne and Rev. Ray Buchanan, two United Methodist ministers, concerned with world hunger.  In 1979, the two ministers were granted "a special appointment beyond the local church" by then Virginia Conference Bishop, Kenneth Goodson so they could found The Society of St. Andrew in Big Island, Virginia.

For the next five years the two pastors and their families lived together in order to model a simpler lifestyle that rejected consumerism by growing their own vegetables, raising sheep, chickens, and rabbits, etc. At the same time the two pastors lead workshops on responsible lifestyles and hunger issues.

During one such workshop at Franktown United Methodist Church on the Eastern Shore of Virginia, a Farmer named Butch Nottingham questioned Ken and Ray about the facts they presented regarding food waste. From the discussion that followed, the Potato and Produce Project was born. On June 3, 1983, a farmer from Chadbourn, North Carolina, donated a tractor-trailer load of sweet potatoes to the Society of St. Andrew. This first load of salvaged sweet potatoes was delivered to the Central Virginia Food Bank in Richmond, Virginia.

Since that first load in 1983 the Society of St. Andrew's Potato and Produce Project has distributed well over 500 million pounds of food to America's hungry. Originally the ministry operated out of a converted sheepshed on the farm in Big Island. A new building was constructed in 1990 to house the growing ministry. Also in 1990, as an offshoot of the Potato and Produce Project, The Society of St. Andrew began the Seed Potato Project to offer a hand-up to impoverished communities who wish to grow their own produce.

In 1985, the Society of St. Andrew launched Harvest of Hope, a gleaning and study camp for youth. The first event was held at Camp Occahannock-on-the-Bay, on Virginia's Eastern Shore, and was led by Rev. Rhonda VanDyke Colby. A major component of Harvest of Hope is field gleaning. As more and more people became exposed to gleaning, they wanted to introduce it to their own churches. As a result, the Gleaning Network was established in Virginia in 1988. Since then, gleaning has expanded dramatically.

Beginning in 1992, the Society of St. Andrew has expanded into other states in the form of regional offices and gleaning ministries.

References

External links 
 
 https://endhunger.org/docs_private/IRS-990.pdf
 https://endhunger.org/docs_site/Annual_Report.pdf

Christian charities based in the United States
Organizations established in 1979
Charities based in Virginia
Christian relief organizations